The short-bearded honeyeater (Melionyx nouhuysi) is a species of bird in the honeyeater family Meliphagidae. It is found mainly in West Papua.  Its natural habitat is subtropical or tropical moist montane forests.

This species was formerly placed in the genus Melidectes. It was moved to the resurrected genus Melionyx based on the results of a molecular phylogenetic study published in 2019. At the same time the common name was changed from "short-bearded melidectes" to "short-bearded honeyeater".

References

short-bearded honeyeater
Birds of Western New Guinea
short-bearded honeyeater
short-bearded honeyeater
Taxonomy articles created by Polbot